The Hours with You is a 2014 Mexican drama film by Catalina Aguilar Mastretta in her directorial debut.

Cast 
Cassandra Ciangherotti - Ema
María Rojo - Julieta
Isela Vega - Abu
Arcelia Ramírez - Isabel

References

External links 

Mexican drama films
2010s Mexican films